Demolition High is a 1996 direct-to-video American action film starring Corey Haim, Alan Thicke, and Dick Van Patten.

Plot
A group of terrorists led by Luther take over a high school. Whilst outside, authorities work to negotiate with the terrorists, a group of students lead a revolt in order to prevent a disaster, led by Lenny Slater.

Cast
 Corey Haim as Lenny Slater
 Alan Thicke as Slater
 Dick Van Patten as General Wainwright
 Melissa Brasselle as Tanya
 Jeff Kober as Luther
 Stacie Randall  as Dugan

Production
Wynorski later recalled "Corey Haim was a nice kid who was totally fucked up in the head. You could see the path he was going down even then. I wish I could have turned him around. But I had to have a paid babysitter with him all the time. Believe it or not, he had to have a babysitter. The kid was in his early 20s and still didn’t have it figured out yet."

Sequel
In 1997, the sequel Demolition University was released with Haim reprising his role as Lenny and Ami Dolenz as Jenny.

References

External links
 
 
 

1996 direct-to-video films
1996 films
1996 action films
American action films
Direct-to-video action films
1990s English-language films
Films directed by Jim Wynorski
Films scored by Kevin Kiner
Films shot in Los Angeles
American teen films
Films about terrorism
1990s American films